() is a term in Japanese pornography for a facial expression of characters (usually women) during sex, typically with rolling or crossed eyes, protruding tongue, and slightly reddened face, to show enjoyment or ecstasy. The style is often used in erotic manga, anime, and video games.

Etymology
Thus,  can be interpreted as 'moaning or panting face'.

Many other terms have been coined for the facial expressions made at the moment of orgasm. One of these is  meaning 'coming [i.e., orgasmic] face'. Others are acmegao (アクメ顔) from the French loanword acmé (orgasm), and yogarigao (よがり顔) for "satisfaction face".

Description
Typical characteristics are rolled or crossed eyes, a hanging tongue, and flushed cheeks. A character's overall face shape may also be distorted in  scenes.An  face of various levels of distortion is used to depict different grades of sexual arousal.  indicates that the pleasure experienced is so intense that the character loses control of their facial expression.

A number of non-adult works feature  faces.

In The History of Hentai Manga, hentai manga researcher Kimi Rito states that  follow three particular traits that set them apart from other ikigao (orgasm face) expressions:

History
Also known as the O-Face, the term  dates at least as far back as the early 1990s. Pornographic magazines used the word to describe the facial expressions of female live-action porn actresses during orgasm. In the same context,  was used in some postings at 2Channel and its sister community for adult content, BBSPink, as well as in pornographic videos at adult e-commerce platforms in the early 2000s.

In the midst of the 2000s, use of the term increased, and the drawing style became rather conventionalized and started spreading throughout the  culture. In 2008, the first -themed  comics anthology, A-H-E, was released. In the 2010s, major publishers produced more -themed comic anthologies. By that time, the facial expression was featured in regular pornographic videos during the popularization of  fetishes in the real-life sex industry. -like exaggerated facial expressions are also sometimes featured in other anime and manga works, in a non-sexual context. In September 2016, an " challenge" meme spread on social media websites, mostly via Instagram, which spread the trend in the United States.

Kimi claims that reasons for including  in a scene include reflecting a character's joyful emotions such as ecstasy or pleasure; to show negative emotions such as fear or reluctance; or to show domination, submission and loyalty.

According to an article from adult gaming site Nutaku,  in combination with the peace sign became an Internet meme in Japan, known as " double peace". Kimi states that this version was usually used after a gang rape scene, either breaking the victim's spirit or as the final part of a humiliation scene. However, as this was limiting, the use of the  double peace became more common as a joke. The term itself is credited as first appearing in a 2010 self-published video game called Futa Letter, in which the main character's girlfriend does a  double peace in a video sent to her boyfriend after she is "broken" by his uncle. In 2018, Belle Delphine drew coverage from various media outlets for her Instagram modeling which often featured her ahegao expressions.

Ahegao clothing

In 2015, an image by the hentai artist Hirame depicting various anime characters with the ahegao face circled the internet. Later that year, the pictures appeared on clothing. In May 2017, such images started appearing in western fashion, the clothes depicting among other works an image from the hentai Danke Dankei Revolution by Asanagi. This version is now sold by English-language hentai publisher FAKKU.

Ban of ahegao clothing
In January 2020, several anime conventions throughout the United States banned ahegao clothing on their grounds and forbade entry to those wearing such clothing. A similar movement was also done in Malaysia in 2022.

Trademark registration and lawsuit
The Chinese company Shenzhen Guangcai Trading filed a trademark registration for the term "Ahegao" in September 2018 and got approved by the United States Patent and Trademark Office on 23 April 2019. On 27 July 2020, Jacob Grady, the CEO of FAKKU, announced intent to contest the trademark registration and accused Shenzhen Guangcai Trading of using stolen artwork.

References

External links

 Hentai Language A to Z
 Yuribou Hentai Dictionary 

Japanese pornography
Anime and manga terminology
Hentai
Facial expressions
Sexual fetishism
Internet memes introduced in the 2010s
Clothing brands
Fashion aesthetics